Jim Stanton is an American composer and political writer.

Musician
Stanton was a drummer with the Tommy Dorsey Orchestra in the mid-1960s. He played with various small groups and big bands through the 1960s and early 1970s. He co-led his own recording and performing group, Dialogue, in the 1970s.

Composer, playwright, and writer
Stanton wrote the score for an original radio production of The Trial of the Catonsville Nine by Daniel Berrigan, played on WBAI-FM in New York City in 1971. He wrote a two-person play, Chatoyant, in 1977, opening and performing it in the Philadelphia area with music played by Terry Gross on Fresh Air.

Stanton composed sound and score for an original production of Shakespeare's The Tempest in 1980 (People's Light and Theatre Company, Malvern, Pennsylvania).

He would go on to write many independent orchestral pieces, scored for many different instrumental combinations.

In the spring of 2008, he began writing his autobiography.

Politics
Stanton wrote many articles for the Philadelphia Weekly (Welcomat) and various national publications on politics and history (1982 to '84).

References

External links
 Historycooperative.org
 Americanforeignrelations.com
 Proconservative.net

American political writers
American male non-fiction writers
American male composers
21st-century American composers
Living people
21st-century American male musicians
Year of birth missing (living people)